Same Same was a pop duo consisting of identical twins, Bob and Clint Moffatt, originally members of the Canadian boyband The Moffatts. Same Same was based in Thailand and they sold albums and performed mainly in Thailand, Indonesia, Malaysia and the Philippines.

Background
On March 26, 2006, Same Same released their first album, The Meaning of Happy, and in the summer of 2006 started an international tour throughout Thailand, Indonesia and the Philippines.

For The Meaning of Happy, they have collaborated with Thai producer Warut Rintranukul and with several Asian artists, such as Arpaporn Nakornsawan and Nui of The Peachband, Lovi Poe, Audy, Jaclyn Victor and duo Michelle & Vickie. For their music videos, they worked with famous Thai director Nonthee Nimitbut. They have hosted the MTV Asia Awards primer, Road To Bangkok and were presenters for the said awards as well. Same Same also sang for the World Cup 2006 album entitled Voices from The FIFA World Cup, for the songs "Give It All You Got" (with Arpaporn Nakornsawan) and "Believe in Your Dream" with The Sony BMG All-Stars (Thailand).

In September 2006, Same Same decided to take a hiatus. In January 2007, the band announced that they would be holding a contest for fans to choose a new band name for them. Their fansite, Same Same Music, shut down the following month. In 2011, Bob and Clint Moffatt reside in Nashville, Tennessee. They had been writing songs and briefly worked on a material for a country album performing under the name Two Bullet Parade, but later changed their name to Like Strangers. They performed in venues around the Nashville metropolitan area. In 2016, Clint and Bob released their new EP under the name Endless Summer, with the debut single 'Amen For Women'. They later changed their name to Music Travel Love.

Reception
Same Same's single "Love Isn't" debuted at number seventeen on the MYX Hit Chart for the week of June 4–10, 2006. The next single, "Without You", which featured then upcoming singer Lovi, stayed on the 12th position of the MYX Hit Chart for three weeks. They reached number one in the RX 93.1 Countdown Top 7 and 96.3 WRock Top 5 Favorites. The Philippines' magazine Top 40 Hits included an article on Same Same and featured them on the cover of the issue. They have also been featured in articles in the Philippine Star, Filipino Journal and many other newspapers and magazines. Same Same's The Meaning of Happy has attained gold award status in Thailand and platinum in Indonesia.

Discography
The Meaning of Happy (2006)

See also
Scott Moffatt
Dave Moffatt

References

MYX Hit Chart Weekly Update. URL accessed on June 30, 2006.

Moffatts Biography on CanEHdian.com. URL accessed on June 30, 2006.

External links
Same Same Philippine Street Team Myspace
Same Same archives

Same Same
Canadian boy bands
Canadian musical duos
Pop music duos
Male musical duos
Twin musical duos
The Moffatts members
Musical groups established in 2006
Musical groups disestablished in 2006
The Moffatts
Identical twin males